The 1936 Campeonato Nacional de Fútbol Profesional was Chilean first tier's 4th season.  Audax Italiano were the champions, breaking the hegemony which Magallanes maintained between 1933 and 1935, winning three consecutive titles.

Scores

Standings

Topscorer

References

External links 
ANFP 
RSSSF Chile 1936

Primera División de Chile seasons
Primera
Chile